DYVR (657 AM) RMN Roxas is a radio station owned and operated by the Radio Mindanao Network. The station's studio and transmitter are located at Brgy. Punta Tabuc, Roxas, Capiz.

DYVR was formerly on 1377 kHz from its inception in 1980 to 2004, when it transferred to its current frequency. DYVR closely competed on the number one spot against DYOW Bombo Radyo during its entry in the city in the early 1990s.

References

Radio stations in Capiz
Radio stations established in 1980
News and talk radio stations in the Philippines